Stella Gonet (born 8 May 1960) is a Scottish theatre, film and television actress. She is known for her roles in the BBC dramas The House of Eliott (1991–94) and Holby City (2007–09). Her stage credits include playing Ophelia in the 1989 National Theatre revival of Hamlet, opposite both Daniel Day-Lewis and Ian Charleson as Hamlet, and playing Margaret Thatcher in the original West End production of Handbagged (2014). She played Queen Elizabeth II in the 2021 movie Spencer.

Early life
Gonet was born in Greenock, Scotland. Her Polish father met her Scottish mother, a teacher of English, when he was stationed in Greenock during the Second World War. She is the seventh of twelve children and four of her sisters are nurses.

She trained at the Royal Scottish Academy of Music and Drama.

Career 
Gonet starred as Beatrice Eliott, one of the two lead roles, in three series of the television drama The House of Eliott, and played Chief Executive Officer Jayne Grayson in the medical drama Holby City. She also has appeared in Casualty, The Crow Road, Dalziel and Pascoe, The Inspector Lynley Mysteries, Foyle's War, Outnumbered and Lewis. She played a villain in the mini-series The Secret and played Grace Maplin in the Sins of Commission episode of Midsomer Murders.

Her screen credits also include For Queen and Country, Nicholas Nickleby, and Red Mercury.

Gonet also has acted extensively in the theatre. In 1989, she appeared as Ophelia in the National Theatre production of Hamlet, with the title role being played by Daniel Day-Lewis, Ian Charleson and finally Jeremy Northam.

She played Margaret Thatcher in the Moira Buffini play Handbagged in 2013 at the Tricycle Theatre, and in 2014 at the Vaudeville Theatre when the play transferred to the West End.

She played Elizabeth in the 2018 BBC1 drama series, The Cry.

In 2020, she played Caroline Sturgess in the BBC drama The Salisbury Poisonings.

In 2021 she appears in the second series of the Sky television series Breeders.

Television

Personal life 
Gonet married English actor Nicholas Farrell in 2005. The couple co-starred in an episode of Roman Mysteries as Queen Berenice of Judea and Emperor Titus, and as Mr. and Mrs. Musgrove in ITV's 2007 production of Jane Austen's Persuasion, and they both participated in a 2001 Shakespeare's Richard III audiobook. The couple have a daughter, Natasha, born in 2000.

References

External links
 

1960 births
Living people
Scottish film actresses
Scottish television actresses
Scottish stage actresses
Alumni of the Royal Conservatoire of Scotland
People from Greenock
Scottish expatriates in the United States